Divine Madness is the fifth novel in the CHERUB series by Robert Muchamore. In this novel, CHERUB agents James, Lauren, and Dana go to Australia to investigate a religious cult called the Survivors.

Plot 
Kerry, Bruce and Kyle are on a mission in Hong Kong to befriend Clyde Xu, a teenage environmentalist who has been recruited by Help Earth. After Clyde meets with Help Earth operative Barry Cox, Bruce follows Barry back to his hotel room and incapacitates him before stealing his information. An MI5 investigation in Cox's activities uncovers that Help Earth are being funded by wealthy Australian cult The Survivors, who are in turn profiting from terrorist attacks committed by Help Earth. James, Lauren and underachieving grey-shirt Dana Smith are paired with ASIS agent Abigail Sanders in order to infiltrate The Survivors. Before James leaves, Kerry asks to give their relationship another try when he returns.

The cherubs go undercover in Australia and are soon recruited by the cult, moving into their Brisbane commune. James and Lauren are sent to the Survivor's elite boarding school in the Ark, the Survivors' isolated Outback headquarters. Meanwhile, Dana and fellow Survivor Eve Stannis are recruited to aid Barry and his fellow Help Earth operative Nina Richards in a terrorist attack on a LNG terminal.

In the Ark, James befriends Rathbone "Rat" Regan, son of Survivors founder Joel Regan, who is immune to the cult's brainwashing techniques. Rat introduces James to Susie Regan, who Lauren discovers is embezzling from the Survivors' investments to bankroll Help Earth; Rat also reveals that Susie is having an affair with Help Earth operative Brian Evans, who is running a Help Earth laboratory near the Ark. The Australian military prepares to storm the Ark, and James and Lauren attempt to retrieve Susie's data before the assault. They are followed by Rat and are forced to reveal CHERUB's existence to him. They enter Regan's quarters to find that Susie has killed him and fled the Ark, and the Ark is put into lockdown before the trio can escape. The raid begins, but the military are forced to fall back after one of their helicopters is shot down by the Survivors. James, Lauren and Rat are caught trying to escape and locked in a room with several young children. When the order comes for the Survivors to fall back into the Ark's fortified church, Rat suggests escaping through a sewage tank. Lauren refuses to leave without taking the children with them, and the group manages to escape the Ark before it is destroyed when explosives laid by the Survivors are accidentally detonated.

Meanwhile, Barry reveals that the facility to be attacked is not in Australia as originally assumed, but instead in Indonesia. With no other backup coming and no way of warning mission control, Dana incapacitates Barry and Nina while their boat sails across the Arafura Sea, but is too late to stop Eve leaving in their dinghy in an attempt to complete the attack herself; Eve ultimately drowns at sea. Susie and Brian are apprehended before they can leave Australia.

The cherubs visit former CHERUB Amy Collins to recuperate. Rat is accepted into CHERUB, Dana is awarded her navy shirt, while, to James' disbelief, Lauren is awarded her black shirt for saving the children from the Ark.

Development

Censored section 
Divine Madness is one of two CHERUB stories where part of a scene had been cut out. The scene in question was the segment where Kyle and Bruce were chasing a suspected member of Help Earth. In the original version of the scene, Bruce beats up a passenger who calls him names while boarding the train. In the published book, this is not shown due to excessive violence. The cover is Bruce ignoring the comment.

Extra story 
On the CHERUB website, there is a bonus chapter entitled "Disconnected". It is set during Chapter 44 of Divine Madness, and introduces James' father.

Awards 
Divine Madness won the Lancashire Children's Book of the Year in 2007.

References

External links 
 Official CHERUB page for book
 

CHERUB novels
2006 British novels
Novels set in Australia
Hodder & Stoughton books
Eco-terrorism in fiction